Liberation Mosque, formerly the St. Mary's Cathedral or Holy Mother of God Church, is located in the Tepebaşı district of Şahinbey, Gaziantep in Turkey. Initially built as an Armenian Apostolic church, it was converted into a stable after the Armenian genocide; and later, into a jail. Sarkis Balyan—the Ottoman-Armenian architect serving Sultan Abdul Hamid II—designed the church. The building was constructed between 1892 and 1893, undertaken by the stonemason Sarkis Taşçıyan. The church was part of a complex which also contained a school and the administrative buildings of the dioceses of the kaza of Antep.

In 1915, almost all of the Gaziantep Armenians were deported to Syrian desert during the genocide. The church was sealed on 22 August 1915; and its sacramentals and furnishings were put in a large stable, then they were bought and sold at an auction. For over three years the cathedral was used by government for military purposes. Next, it was turned into a prison in the early 1920s; and served as this facility until 1970s.

The building was converted into a mosque in 1986. The top half of the bell tower was demolished, the remainder converted into a single-balcony minaret. The bell, which was cast in the 19th century in South America, was taken to Gaziantep Museum.

After renovation, the mosque reopened on 17 June 2017.

During the 2023 Turkey–Syria earthquakes, its dome and minarets collapsed.

See also
Armenian cultural heritage in Turkey
Conversion of non-Islamic places of worship into mosques
Armenian architecture

References

1892 establishments in the Ottoman Empire
1915 disestablishments in the Ottoman Empire
1986 establishments in Turkey
19th-century churches in Turkey
20th-century religious buildings and structures in Turkey
Armenian Apostolic cathedrals in Turkey
Buildings damaged by the 2023 Turkey–Syria earthquake
Churches completed in 1893
Defunct prisons in Turkey
Demolished buildings and structures in Turkey
Destroyed churches in Turkey
Destroyed mosques
First Turkish National architecture
Former Armenian Apostolic churches
Former cathedrals in Turkey
Mosque buildings with domes
Mosques completed in 1986
Mosques converted from churches
Mosques converted from churches in Turkey
Mosques in Gaziantep
Sarkis Balyan buildings
Stone buildings